Senator Lamont may refer to:

George D. Lamont (1819–1876), New York State Senate
William C. Lamont (1827–?), New York State Senate